Rhachidelus is a genus of snake in the subfamily Dipsadinae of the family Colubridae. The genus is endemic to South America.

Species
The genus Rhachidelus is monotypic, containing the sole species Rhachidelus brazili, which is commonly known as the Brazilian bird snake.

Etymology
The specific name, brazili, is in honor of Brazilian herpetologist Vital Brazil.

Geographic range
R. brazili is found in northeastern Argentina, southern Brazil, and southeastern Paraguay.

Habitat
The preferred natural habitats of R. brazili are forest and savanna.

Description
R. brazili is a medium-sized species of snake. The dorsal scales are smooth, have distinct paired apical pits, and are arranged in 25 rows at midbody. The vertebral row is enlarged. Adults are shiny dark brown to black dorsally, and dark brown ventrally. Juveniles have a red band across the back of the top of the head, including the parietal scales.

Diet
The diet of R. brazili consists mainly of birds' eggs.

Reproduction
R. brazili is oviparous.

References

Further reading
Boulenger GA (1908). "On a new Genus of Snakes from Brazil". Annals and Magazine of Natural History, Eighth Series 2: 31–32. (Rhachidelus, new genus; R. brazili, new species).
Freiberg M (1982). Snakes of South America. Hong Kong: T.F.H. Publications. 189 pp. . (Rhachidelus, pp. 79, 108).

Dipsadinae
Monotypic snake genera
Snakes of South America
Reptiles of Argentina
Reptiles of Brazil
Reptiles of Paraguay
Fauna of the Pantanal
Reptiles described in 1908